Phayul.com (Fatherland in Tibetan) is a leading English language news portal. website that publishes news and opinion about Tibet and Tibet-in-exile. Created in 2001 by Tibetan exiles in India, it is published in the English language from Dharamsala. The site also includes book reviews, stories, essays, and a discussion forum. Its director is Tenzin Norsang Lateng and the editor is Kalsang Rinchen.

References

External links

Tibet
Tibetan diaspora
Tibetan news websites
Tibetan society
Internet properties established in 2001
Indian news websites
Dharamshala
Mass media in Himachal Pradesh